Charles Elkert was a member of the Wisconsin State Assembly.

Biography
Elkert was born on December 8, 1849 in Prussia. He moved to Milwaukee, Wisconsin in 1851 and became a tanner.

Political career
Elkert was a member of the Assembly during the 1885 and 1889 sessions. Additionally, he was a member of the county board of supervisors of Milwaukee County, Wisconsin and a Milwaukee alderman. He was a Republican.

References

Republican Party members of the Wisconsin State Assembly
Milwaukee Common Council members
County supervisors in Wisconsin
Tanners
1849 births
Year of death missing